Río de Oro  is one of the two territories that formed the Spanish province of Spanish Sahara after 1969.

Río de Oro may also refer to:

Río de Oro, Cesar, a town in Colombia
Río de Oro (Melilla), a river in Morocco
Río de Oro (Argentina), a river in Argentina
Río de Oro (Catatumbo), a river in Colombia and Venezuela

See also
Río del Oro (disambiguation)